Channel 82 was removed from television use in 1983. The second-highest frequency to have been used for NTSC-M terrestrial TV broadcasting, it was formerly used by a handful of television stations in North America which broadcast on 878-884 MHz. In the United States, channels 70-83 served primarily as a "translator band" for repeater transmitters filling gaps in coverage for existing stations:
 KG2XEL Emporium, Pennsylvania, the first experimental 10-watt signal on this channel (1953), rebroadcast WJAC-TV Johnstown in order to circumvent hills which posed local obstacles to the main WJAC signal.
 KATU (ABC Portland) rebroadcaster K82AT Tillamook, Oregon, formerly on this channel, has moved to K43EJ channel 43.
 KBJR (NBC Duluth) rebroadcaster K82AJ International Falls, Minnesota moved to K60BT channel 60.
 KRQE (CBS Albuquerque) rebroadcasters K82AC Romeo, Colorado and K82AR Durango, Colorado were moved to K45GD channel 45 and K31FV channel 31.
 KFOR-TV (NBC Oklahoma City) rebroadcaster K82BB Seiling, Oklahoma has been moved to K53CI channel 53.
 KESQ-TV (ABC Palm Springs) rebroadcaster K82BQ Hemet, California was used in the 1980s.

References 

82